Zaklyazmensky is a rural locality (a settlement) in Vladimir, Vladimir Oblast, Russia. The population was 1,373 as of 2010. There are five streets.

Geography 
Zaklyazmensky is located 7 km southeast of Vladimir. Kommunar is the nearest rural locality.

References 

Rural localities in Vladimir Urban Okrug